Mark Sherwin Inch is a retired United States Army major general who served as the 9th Director of the Federal Bureau of Prisons of the United States. He resigned from that position on May 18, 2018.

U.S. Attorney General Jeff Sessions named Inch to head the Federal Bureau of Prisons in the Department of Justice (DOJ) on August 1, 2017. Inch, who also holds degrees in geography and archaeology, had supervised prisons of the United States Army for two years. Inch assumed office as Director of the Federal Bureau of Prisons on September 18, 2017. On January 3, 2019, Governor-elect Ron DeSantis of Florida announced that Inch would head the Florida Department of Corrections. On May 2, 2019, Inch was confirmed by the Florida Senate as the Secretary of Corrections. November 19, 2021 Inch announced his retirement and was replaced by Deputy Secretary Ricky Dixon.

Education
 U.S. Army Command and General Staff College, Master's Degree, Military Operational Art and Science/Studies, 2004 – 2005
 University of Texas at Austin, Master's Degree, Geography (Regional Concentration: Middle East/Africa), (1992), Thesis: Decision-making and the implementation of security land use policies : a case study of Iraq – Summer 1990 to Summer 1992.
 Wheaton College, Bachelor's Degree, Biblical Archaeology, 1978 – 1982

References

External links
Official FBP Biography
Official Biography (pdf) for Major General Mark S. Inch
Mr inch please free, "Tyree Taylor out the small Town of southern Georgia "folkston Georgia"George, J. Can a General Conquer the Federal Prison System? Marshall Project
Patrol Debrief #5: The Servant Leader (Part 1) (MP Project Junto)

Year of birth missing (living people)
Living people
State cabinet secretaries of Florida
Federal Bureau of Prisons officials
United States Department of Justice officials
Trump administration personnel
American geographers
Wheaton College (Illinois) alumni
University of Texas at Austin College of Liberal Arts alumni
United States Army Command and General Staff College alumni
Recipients of the Distinguished Service Medal (US Army)
Recipients of the Defense Superior Service Medal
Recipients of the Legion of Merit
United States Army personnel of the War in Afghanistan (2001–2021)
United States Army personnel of the Iraq War
United States Army generals